Oh My Baby is a 2020 South Korean television series starring Jang Na-ra, Go Jun, Park Byung-eun and Jung Gun-joo. It premiered on tvN on May 13, 2020. The series is available for streaming starting from July 3, 2022, on Netflix in the United States.

Synopsis
Jang Ha-ri (Jang Na-ra) is a 39-year-old single woman and a workaholic who has not been in a relationship for over 10 years but wants to have a baby of her own. Just when she has given up on love and marriage, three men appear in front of her.

Cast

Main
 Jang Na-ra as Jang Ha-ri, a devoted manager who works for a magazine The Baby. She is in race against time to have a child, even if it means skipping marriage. Now 39, she has three suitable prospects lining up to win her over. 
 Go Jun as Han I-sang, a narcissistic photographer who's always in high demand. He suffered heartbreak when his fiancée broke off their engagement which was the reason for him to lose interest in relationships and vehemently rejected Ha-ri on their first meeting. 
 Park Byung-eun as Yoon Jae-young, a recently divorced pediatrician who has a daughter Do-a and is good friends with Ha-ri. He turns up to stay with Ha-ri at her mom's house on Ha-ri's mom persuasion. 
 Jung Gun-joo as Choi Kang-eu-tteum, a junior at Ha-ri's workplace who initially embarrasses her by calling her Auntie

Supporting
 Kim Jae-hwa as Shim Jung-hwa
 Baek Seung-hee as Park Yeon-ho
 Park Soo-ah as Choi Hyo-joo
 Jung Sun-kyung as Lee So-yoon
 Kim Hye-ok as Lee Ok-ran, Ha-ri's mother who raised her single-handedly.
 Lee Mi-do as Kim Eun-yeong
 Jo Hee-bong as Nam Soo-cheol
 Yoon Jung-hoon as Yoon Seung-ho
 Kim Jung-hwa as Jung In-ah
 Wang Ji-hye as Seo Jung-won
 Kim Ye-ryeong as Lee Ok-hwi
 Baek Seung-hee as Park Yeon-ho
 Lee Han-wi as Park Jae-han
 Yoo Seung-mok as Kim Cheol-joong, department head.

Special appearances
 Jang Gwang as President Jo (Chairman) (Ep.4)
 Lee Dong-gun
 Yeo Hoe-hyun
 Jeon Hye-bin

Viewership

References

External links
  
 
 

Korean-language television shows
TVN (South Korean TV channel) television dramas
2020 South Korean television series debuts
2020 South Korean television series endings
South Korean romantic comedy television series
Television series by Studio Dragon
Television series by Next Entertainment World